Francis Moore (18 July 1827 – 14 January 1900) was an English cricketer. Moore's batting style is unknown, though it is known he played as a wicket-keeper. He was born at Nottingham, Nottinghamshire.

Moore made a single first-class appearance for Nottinghamshire against Surrey at The Oval in 1862. He ended Nottinghamshire's first-innings of 172 all out unbeaten on 8, while in Surrey's first-innings of 108 all out he stumped H. H. Stephenson off the bowling of Cris Tinley. Having batted at number eleven in Nottinghamshire's first-innings, Moore opened the batting in their second-innings, scoring an unbeaten 4 runs before the match was declared a draw. This was his only major appearance for Nottinghamshire.

He died at the city of his birth on 14 January 1900.

References

External links
Francis Moore at ESPNcricinfo
Francis Moore at CricketArchive

1827 births
1900 deaths
Cricketers from Nottingham
English cricketers
Nottinghamshire cricketers
Wicket-keepers